Attasaddy Misurata Sports Club is a Libyan football club based in Qasr Ahmad, Misurata City, Libya.
The club is playing in the Libyan Second Division

History
Attasaddy Misurata Sports Club was founded on 1983

External links
Kooora.com profile

 
Association football clubs established in 1983
1983 establishments in Libya